Georg Pelster (January 1, 1897 – in Rheine; June 25, 1963 in Rheine) was a German politician of the Christian Democratic Union (CDU) and former member of the German Bundestag.

Life 
From 1949 to 1961, he was a member of the German Bundestag, where he represented the constituency of Steinfurt-Tecklenburg as the last directly elected member of parliament with 60.8% of the first votes. From 16 July 1952 to 19 March 1958 he was also a member of the European Parliament.

Literature

References

1897 births
1963 deaths
People from Rheine
Members of the Bundestag for North Rhine-Westphalia
Members of the Bundestag 1957–1961
Members of the Bundestag 1953–1957
Members of the Bundestag 1949–1953
Members of the Bundestag for the Christian Democratic Union of Germany
Christian Democratic Union of Germany MEPs
MEPs for Germany 1958–1979